Little Meadows may refer to:

Little Meadows, Maryland, a frequent campsite of George Washington.
Little Meadows, Pennsylvania, a small town in northern Pennsylvania.